Lahainaluna High School is a public high school with the grades 9-12 located in Lahaina (on the island of Maui). Lahainaluna High School is also a public boarding school.  It was founded in 1831 as a Protestant missionary school, originally named Lahainaluna Seminary.  The early missionaries who arrived in Lahaina in 1823 explained to the Hawaiian Royalty the importance of an educational institution in the American style.

A number of the pioneers, students and teachers are buried in a small graveyard behind several buildings on the campus.  It was the first formal European-American style school founded in Hawaii and has continued to operate to this day.

History and traditions
American William Richards founded the missionary station in Lahaina in 1823. In June 1831, Lorrin Andrews was chosen as first principal of a seminary for boys and young men. The site was named Lahainaluna for "upper Lahaina".
On September 5, 1831, classes began in thatched huts with 25 Hawaiian young men as students, including former royal historian David Malo. The second principal was William Patterson Alexander 1843–1856. The school eventually became part of the public school system in Hawaii. The post-secondary program later became developed as part of the first University of Hawaii.

Lahainaluna has a boarding program where students from the outer islands (including students from the "other side of the island") can live and study at either of the campus dormitories. In return, they do various jobs around the campus, such as maintaining the landscape, tending to the farm animals, and making student meals at the cafeteria; they work 18 hours per week. Initially and exclusively for males, the boarding program became coed in 1980. The two dorms are David Malo Dormitory for the boys and Hoapili Dormitory for the girls. Previously, Hoapili housed both genders. Lahainaluna is one of very few public boarding schools in the nation.

There is an 30-ft "L" on the mountain-side overlooking Lahaina at the 2,000 ft elevation mark. The "L" stands for Lahainaluna and has been there since 1904. Twice a year, the boarders at Lahainaluna lay a fresh coat of white lime on Pu'u Pa'u Pa'u. The boarding students must carry 50 lb sacks of lime to the site, clear the weeds, and clean up the site. Added to the "L" are embellishments of the year and athletic championships for the previous year. On a clear day, the freshly limed L can be seen from the island of Molokai. It is located at coordinates . Lime is used because it's natural and does not interfere with the ecosystem. After the students have completed restoring the "L", they lay fresh leis at David Malo's gravesite, chant, sing and pray.

Historically, on graduation day alumni hike up the "L" and light up torches that line the "L" to symbolize the graduates have received their diplomas.

The school celebrates David Malo Day annually. That day a feast is served and the Hawaiiana Club puts on a performance.

Hale Pai

Hale Pa'i, or the house of printing, is a small coral and timber building on the Lahainaluna campus that, starting in 1834, served as the home of Hawaii's first printing press. English and Hawaiian language Bibles, books and newspapers were printed here, including the first newspaper printed west of the Rocky Mountains. The first paper currency of Hawaii was printed here in 1843. A student was expelled in 1844 for counterfeiting, which resulted in the government re-issuing all the paper money with secret marks.

Many archived publications are on public display at the site, now a museum maintained by the Lahaina Restoration Foundation.  Hale Pa'i, also known as Hawaii Site No. 50-03-1596, was listed on the National Register of Historic Places in 1976.

Campus
Lahainaluna High School is located on the side of an extinct volcano.  The multiple classroom buildings are widespread.  The grounds are covered with many benches, pathways, grass, plants and trees, the latter providing shade. The ceramic sculpture Orbit by Toshiko Takaezu is located here.  A small stream runs near the school, past the Agriculture area. Lahainaluna is high enough on this volcano to allow views of the Pacific and of the islands of Moloka'i, Lana'i and Kaho'olawe. It is considered one of the best views from any school in the islands.

It has a boarding facility available.The program takes American students and students with other citizenships. Girls go to the Hoapili Dormitory and boys go to the David Malo Dormitory.

Notable alumni 

Timothy Haʻalilio, Class of 1835 – Native Hawaiian politician 
William Kahaiali'i, Class of 1979 – Hawaiian music artist
Samuel Kamakau, Class of 1837 – Native Hawaiian historian and scholar
Jonah Kapena, Class of 1835 – Native Hawaiian politician
Boaz Mahune, Class of 1835 – Native Hawaiian politician 
David Malo, Class of 1835 – Native Hawaiian scholar, adviser to the Hawaiian royal family
Jonatana Napela, Native Hawaiian attorney, judge and LDS convert, helped translate the Book of Mormon into the Hawaiian language
Keali'i Reichel, Class of 1980 – Hawaiian music artist
Kalani Simpson, Class of 1989—former sports columnist for Honolulu Star-Advertiser
Hercules Mata'afa, Class of 2014 - NFL player, 2017 Polynesian College Football Player of the Year, and Consensus All American. Now plays for the Minnesota Vikings.

Organizations 
School Clubs:
Academy of Hospitality and Tourism – A business class and club that is a part of the National Academy Foundation. Students participate in mock interviews, go on job shadowing and internships, travel to various parts of North America and Asia, and practice dressing in business attire.
Anime Club – One of the more social interactive clubs on campus that brings students together with the culture and interest of anime.
Aloha Club – A club that is involved in community service projects.
Hawaiiana Club - A club that teaches students hula routines that are then showcased during the annual celebration of David Malo Day. 
Interact Club – A club is involved in community service projects, but on a more international scale the club is currently headed by President Saumalu Mata'afa.
Japanese Club – A club that teaches students the culture of Japan both traditional and modern.
Chess Club – A freelance club holds occasional casual games of chess where students can participate.
Water Polo Club – A co-ed club meant for water polo players and swimmers.
Robotics Club – An after school club that participates in FIRST Robotics Competition and VEX Robotics competitions.  Students also mentor students at Princess Nahienaena elementary school
Flim Club - An after school club that

See also
 List of boarding schools in the United States

References

External links

Lahainaluna High School Official web site
Lahainaluna High School Hawaii Department of Education School Information
 
Lahainaluna High School Music Department web site

School buildings on the National Register of Historic Places in Hawaii
Public high schools in Maui
Historic American Buildings Survey in Hawaii
1831 establishments in Hawaii
Educational institutions established in 1831
National Register of Historic Places in Maui County, Hawaii
Public boarding schools in the United States
Boarding schools in Hawaii
Hawaii Register of Historic Places